Sevoflurane, sold under the brand name Sevorane, among others, is a sweet-smelling, nonflammable, highly fluorinated methyl isopropyl ether used as an inhalational anaesthetic for induction and maintenance of general anesthesia. After desflurane, it is the volatile anesthetic with the fastest onset. While its offset may be faster than agents other than desflurane in a few circumstances, its offset is more often similar to that of the much older agent isoflurane. While sevoflurane is only half as soluble as isoflurane in blood, the  tissue blood partition coefficients of isoflurane and sevoflurane are quite similar. For example, in the muscle group: isoflurane 2.62 vs. sevoflurane 2.57. In the fat group: isoflurane 52 vs. sevoflurane 50. As a result, the longer the case, the more similar will be the emergence times for sevoflurane and isoflurane.

Medical uses
Together with desflurane, sevoflurane is replacing isoflurane and halothane in modern anesthesia practice. It is often administered in a mixture of nitrous oxide and oxygen.

Physiologic effects
Sevoflurane is a potent vasodilator, as such it induces a dose dependent reduction in blood pressure and cardiac output. It is a bronchodilator, however, in patients with pre-existing lung pathology it may precipitate coughing and laryngospasm. It reduces the ventilatory response to hypoxia and hypercapnia and impedes hypoxic pulmonary vasoconstriction. Sevoflurane vasodilatory properties also cause it to increase intracranial pressure and cerebral blood flow. However, it reduces cerebral metabolic rate.

Adverse Effects
Sevoflurane has an excellent safety record, but is under review for potential hepatotoxicity, and may accelerate Alzheimer's. There were rare reports involving adults with symptoms similar to halothane hepatotoxicity. Sevoflurane is the preferred agent for mask induction due to its lesser irritation to mucous membranes.

Sevoflurane was discovered by Ross Terrell and independently by Bernard M Regan. A detailed report of its development and properties appeared in 1975 in a paper authored by Richard Wallin, Bernard Regan, Martha Napoli and Ivan Stern. It was introduced into clinical practice initially in Japan in 1990 by Maruishi Pharmaceutical Co., Ltd. Osaka, Japan. The rights for sevoflurane worldwide were held by AbbVie. It is now available as a generic drug.

Sevoflurane is an inhaled anaesthetic that is often used to put children asleep for surgery. During the process of waking up from the medication, it has been known to cause agitation and delirium. It is not clear if this can be prevented.

Adverse effects
Studies examining a current significant health concern, anesthetic-induced neurotoxicity (including with sevoflurane, and especially with children and infants) are "fraught with confounders, and many are underpowered statistically", and so are argued to need "further data... to either support or refute the potential connection".

Concern regarding the safety of anaesthesia is especially acute with regard to children and infants, where preclinical evidence from relevant animal models suggest that common clinically important agents, including sevoflurane, may be neurotoxic to the developing brain, and so cause neurobehavioural abnormalities in the long term; two large-scale clinical studies (PANDA and GAS) were ongoing as of 2010, in hope of supplying "significant [further] information" on neurodevelopmental effects of general anaesthesia in infants and young children, including where sevoflurane is used.

In 2021, researchers at Massachusetts General Hospital published in Communications Biology research that sevoflurane may accelerate existing Alzheimer's or existing tau protein to spread: "These data demonstrate anesthesia-associated tau spreading and its consequences. [...] This tau spreading could be prevented by inhibitors of tau phosphorylation or extracellular vesicle generation." According to Neuroscience News, "Their previous work showed that sevoflurane can cause a change (specifically, phosphorylation, or the addition of phosphate) to tau that leads to cognitive impairment in mice. Other researchers have also found that sevoflurane and certain other anesthetics may affect cognitive function."

Pharmacology
The exact mechanism of the action of general anaesthetics has not been delineated. Sevoflurane acts as a positive allosteric modulator of the GABAA receptor in electrophysiology studies of neurons and recombinant receptors. However, it also acts as an NMDA receptor antagonist, potentiates glycine receptor currents, and inhibits nAChR and 5-HT3 receptor currents.

Global-warming potential
Sevoflurane is a greenhouse gas. The twenty-year global-warming potential, GWP(20), for sevoflurane is 349.

References

Further reading

External links 
 

General anesthetics
Ethers
Organofluorides
AbbVie brands
GSK plc brands
GABAA receptor positive allosteric modulators
Glycine receptor agonists
Nicotinic antagonists
NMDA receptor antagonists
5-HT3 antagonists
Fluranes
Trifluoromethyl compounds
Products introduced in 1990
Greenhouse gases